Naval battle off St. John may refer to:

 Naval battle off St. John (1691)
 Naval battle off St. John (1696)